Carla Chambel is a Portuguese actress.

Filmography

Mal (1999)
98 Octanas (2006)
Amália (2008)
Operação Outono (2012)
Quarta Divisão (2013)
Bem-Vindos a Beirais (TV, 2013 – Present)

Awards and nominations

References

External links

Portuguese actresses
Living people
Year of birth missing (living people)
Place of birth missing (living people)